Ashokapuram is a part of the city of Coimbatore in the state of Tamil Nadu, India, located 12 km north of the city center. Ashokapuram is located on a stretch of the Mettupalayam road in Coimbatore. Neighbouring places include Thudiyalur and NGGO Colony.

Demographics
As of the 2001 India census, Ashokapuram had a population of 9676. Males constitute 51% of the population and females 49%. Ashokapuram has an average literacy rate of 84%, higher than the national average of 59.5%; 53% of males and 47% of females are literate. 7% of the population is under 6 years of age.

References

Neighbourhoods in Coimbatore